Reichsgulden was an official coin of the Holy Roman Empire in the 16th century, issued in two, officially equivalent, forms:
the Goldgulden
the Guldengroschen

See also
Gulden (disambiguation)
Reichsmünzordnung